Pyrococcus woesei is an ultra-thermophilic marine archaeon. It is sulfur-reducing and grows optimally between 100 and 103 °C. Its cells have a roughly spherical, elongated and constricted appearance, similar to Thermococcus celer. Frequently, they occur as diploforms. Cells grown on solid supports have dense tufts of flagella or pili attached to one pole.

Kanoksilapatham et al. propose P. woesei as a subspecies of P. furiosus.

It is named after the discoverer of archaea as a whole - Carl Woese

References

Further reading

External links 

WORMS entry
LPSN
Type strain of Pyrococcus woesei at BacDive -  the Bacterial Diversity Metadatabase

Archaea described in 1988
Euryarchaeota